Restieaux is a surname. Notable people with the surname include: 

Alfred Restieaux (1832–1911), British trader in the central Pacific
Charles Restieaux (1865–1918), New Zealand cricketer
Cyril Restieaux (1910–1996), British clergyman
Norma Restieaux (born 1934), New Zealand cardiologist